Nikolaos Tzafouris(), also Niccolo, Niccolò, Niccolö, Zafuri, Zafuris, was a Greek Renaissance painter.  He was one of the founders of the Cretan School.  He was influenced by Angelos Akotantos.  His works influenced Emmanuel Tzanes, Elias Moskos, Georgios Klontzas and Theodoros Poulakis.  Tzafouris was one of the most respected artists in Crete.  His most notable work is Madre della Consolazione.  The painting exhibits a combination of Byzantine and Italian styles.  Another notable painter in Crete around the same time was Andreas Pavias.  According to the Institute of Neohellenic Research, thirteen paintings are attributed to Tzafouris.

History

 Nikolaos was born in Crete. He was influenced by Angelos Akotantos.  The artist traveled to Venice to continue his painting education.  He was exposed to the works of Giovanni Bellini and may have trained with him.  He returned to Crete towards the end of his life where he had a successful workshop.  His workshop mass-produced icons.  He painted a new style Madonna called Madre della Consolazione which was considered the Italian style and was the standard for the next hundred years.  He also emulated Bellini's Pieta which was also heavily copied.

Historians have records of the painter's activities in Crete between 1487 to 1501 involving economic affairs.   In 1492, he worked with famous Greek painter Georgios Vlastos and the sculptor Nikolaos Varvarigos.  The artists worked on a Catholic Church in Nafplio called  Pala D'altare.  Regrettably, nothing from the church survived.   The existing documents notate Tzafouris had a workshop in Heraklion.  Tzafouris painted religious themes for local churches.   He died in Heraklion around 1501.  Tzafouris was mentioned in a will found in Venetian archives on February 23, 1537.

Five of his signed icons survive. His works followed the maniera greca tradition but also exhibited qualities of byzantine paintings and frescos.  Many Cretan painters began to adopt a style mixing Byzantine and Italian techniques. One work executed by Nikolaos Tzafouris was a triptych Pietà with Saints Francis and Mary Magdalen which can be found at the Ashmolean Museum. Another example of signed icon from Nikolaos Tzafouris, Christ Bearing the Cross,  is in the collection of Metropolitan Museum of Art NYC.

Gallery

See also 
Maniera greca

References

Bibliography

Year of birth unknown
Year of death unknown
Cretan Renaissance painters
15th-century births
16th-century deaths
Byzantine artists
15th-century Greek painters